From Where??? is the debut album by underground hip hop artist Mad Skillz. The album was praised for its strong lyrical content and production, however, suffered from low sales, possibly due to being released the same day as 2Pac's All Eyez On Me and The Fugees's The Score. Producers for the album included Jay Dee, The Beatnuts, Buckwild, Large Professor, and DJ Clark Kent. The singles "The Nod Factor" and "Move Ya Body" received moderate radio and video airplay.

Track listing

Samples
It's Goin' Down 
"Boa Palavra" by Sérgio Mendes 
The Nod Factor
"Superman Lover" by Johnny "Guitar" Watson 
VA in the House 
"Fly With the Wings of Love" by Joe Sample
Tongues of the Next Shit
"Night Breeze" by Bobby Lyle
Doin' Time in the Cypha 
"Come into Knowledge" by R.A.M.P.
Extra Abstract Skillz 
"Song Sung Long" by Carla Bley
"Get Out of My Life, Woman" by Allen Toussaint
Get Your Groove On
"Summer Madness" by Kool & the Gang
"The Breakdown (Part II)" by Rufus Thomas
The Jam
"Canto de Ossanha" by Dorothy Ashby
Move Ya Body
"I'm Only Human" by Jeffrey Osborne 
"Just Playing (Dreams)" by the Notorious B.I.G.
Street Rules 
"Modaji" by Dave Grusin 
Unseen World
"Brown Ballad" by Quincy Jones
"Ode to Billie Joe" by Lou Donaldson

Album chart positions

Singles chart positions

References

1996 debut albums
Skillz albums
Albums produced by J Dilla
Albums produced by Buckwild
Albums produced by Clark Kent (producer)
Albums produced by Large Professor
Albums produced by the Beatnuts
Atlantic Records albums